This article lists players who have recently captained the senior Tipperary county football team in the Munster Senior Football Championship and the All-Ireland Senior Football Championship. The captain was originally chosen from the club that had won the Tipperary Senior Football Championship; however, this method has been discontinued and the captain is now chosen by the manager.

List of captains

Gaelic footballers
Tipperary
+Captains